Anton Sergeevich Klementyev (born 25 March 1990) is a Russian former ice hockey defenseman. He played one game for the New York Islanders of the National Hockey League in 2010. The rest of his career, which lasted from 2005 to 2017, was mainly spent in Russia.

Playing career
Klementyev was originally selected 122nd overall by the New York Islanders in the 2009 NHL Entry Draft. He made his NHL debut with the Islanders on 27 March 2010 against the Columbus Blue Jackets.  He was drafted by the Islanders in the 5th round (122nd overall) of the 2009 NHL Entry Draft.

Before joining the Islanders, he spent most of the season playing for the Bridgeport Sound Tigers of the American Hockey League.  He also played for Russia at the 2010 World Junior Ice Hockey Championships.

On 3 February 2012, the New York Islanders placed Anton Klementyev on unconditional waivers. Between 2012 and 2014, he played in the Russian VHL, before moving to the Polish Hockey League for one year, finishing his career with two seasons in the Belarus Extraliga before retiring in 2017.

Career statistics

Regular season and playoffs

International

References

External links 
 

1990 births
Living people
Bridgeport Sound Tigers players
HK Gomel players
Lokomotiv Yaroslavl players
New York Islanders draft picks
New York Islanders players
Sportspeople from Tolyatti
Russian ice hockey defencemen
KH Sanok players